Ncora, officially Ncorha is a town in Chris Hani District Municipality in the Eastern Cape province of South Africa.

References

Populated places in the Intsika Yethu Local Municipality